The Rainforest Site is a "click-to-donate" website, launched in May 2000, that uses ad-based revenue to conserve land in Ecuador, Mexico, Peru, Paraguay and other locations worldwide. In addition, a portion of funding goes to preserve old-growth forest in the state of Washington United States. The Rainforest Site is owned and operated by Tim Kunin and Greg Hesterberg, co-owners of the for-profit company, CharityUSA.com, LLC.

Overview 
The Rainforest site is paid by its sponsors each time someone visits a page with one of the sponsor's ads. The money is then donated to one of several charitable organizations and used to help conserve or preserve rainforest land important to helping sustain biodiversity worldwide. The sponsors will only pay the rainforest site once per click, per person, per day. The site claims that each unique click on The Rainforest Site currently saves  of land.
While The Rainforest Site is not a non-profit website, it claims that 100% of money raised through ad revenue is donated directly to charities. This holds true for all of the click to donate websites operated by CharityUSA, which apparently earn their profit from the sale of merchandise from their websites.

The site raises funds for several charities; The Nature Conservancy, The Rainforest Conservation Fund, The World Parks Endowment, and The Friends of Calakmul.

CharityUSA operates a number of charity-themed advertising and shopping sites, including The Alzheimer's Site, The Autism Site, The Breast Cancer Site, The Child Health Site, The Diabetes Site, The Hunger Site, The Literacy Site, The Veterans Site, The Animal Rescue Site, and The Ecology Fund. CharityUSA is a for-profit company. Although some of the revenue generated by these websites goes to non-profit organizations, a majority of it is claimed by CharityUSA.

Total land conserved

References

External links

Will's Web Watch: 'Charity' sites raise user concerns

Click-to-donate sites
Internet properties established in 2000
American fundraising websites